Xianghe County is a county of central Hebei province. It is under the administration of Langfang prefecture-level city. Xianghe has 7 towns and 2 townships.

Sanhe city, Dachang Hui Autonomous County and Xianghe County form the "Northern Three Counties of Langfang", an exclave of Hebei province surrounded by the municipalities of Beijing and Tianjin.

Administrative divisions
Towns:
Shuyang, Jiangxintun, Qukou, Antoutun, Anping, Liusong, Wubaihu

Townships:
Qianwang Township, Qiantun Township

Climate

Grand Epoch City
The "Grand Epoch City" located in the Xianghe Economic & Technical Development Zone of Hebei Province is a 1/6th scale model of the old walled city of Beijing.

The city was built with a total investment of RMB 3 billion (approx. $481.3 million USD).

References

External links
 Xianghe County government website

County-level divisions of Hebei
Enclaves and exclaves